Edilene Aparecida Andrade (born March 14, 1971 in Ipatinga, Minas Gerais) is a female judoka from Brazil. She competed for her native country at the 1992 Summer Olympics in Barcelona, Spain, where she was defeated in the second round of the repêchage. Aparecida won a bronze medal at the 1991 Pan American Games in the Women's Heavyweight (+ 72 kg).

References
sports-reference

1971 births
Living people
Judoka at the 1992 Summer Olympics
Olympic judoka of Brazil
Brazilian female judoka
Pan American Games bronze medalists for Brazil
Sportspeople from Minas Gerais
People from Ipatinga
Pan American Games medalists in judo
Judoka at the 1991 Pan American Games
Medalists at the 1991 Pan American Games
21st-century Brazilian women
20th-century Brazilian women